Lazar Tufegdžić (born 22 February 1997) is a Serbian professional footballer who plays as a midfielder for CSKA Sofia.

Club career

Red Star Belgrade
Born in Valjevo, passing youth categories, Tufegdžić played friendly matches against OFK Bor and FK Gračanica during the spring of 2015. He spent the summer pre-season and was also licensed for the first team of Red Star Belgrade in the 2015–16 Serbian SuperLiga season. In the winter break off-season, he was loaned to Bežanija until the end of season. In summer 2016, Tufegdžić was also licensed for the UEFA competitions, but later moved on one-year loan to OFK Beograd.

International career
Tufegdžić was a member of Serbia U17 and Serbia U18 national team levels in 2014.

Career statistics

Club

References

External links
 
 

1997 births
Living people
Sportspeople from Valjevo
Association football midfielders
Serbian footballers
Serbia youth international footballers
Red Star Belgrade footballers
FK Bežanija players
OFK Beograd players
FK Spartak Subotica players
PFC CSKA Sofia players
Serbian First League players
Serbian SuperLiga players
First Professional Football League (Bulgaria) players
Serbia international footballers
Serbian expatriate footballers
Expatriate footballers in Bulgaria